More than nine variations of the name have been seen in the records throughout history (Quinsigamond, Quansigemog, Quansigamaug, Quansigamug, Qunnosuog-amaug).  In Native American Algonquian language, Quinsigamond is loosely translated as "the pickerel (or long nose) fishing place." Pickerel is a type of fresh water fish commonly native to inland lakes and ponds.

Quinsigamond - Name references
American Nipmuc Indians named the body of water between Worcester and Shrewsbury, "Quinsigamond", the largest lake in the East.  Colonial settlers also adapted the name of the lake for a nearby village. Quinsigamond was also the name given to the area known today as "Worcester."  The name for Quinsigamond Community College, was also chosen to honor the rich cultural heritage of Worcester County.

Quinsigamond Lake - (Pre-Colonial times)
During the early 1600s, more than 15,000 Nipmuc Native Americans roamed, in small clans, the areas known as; New England, Worcester County, Springfield, New Hampshire, Connecticut and Rhode Island. The Nipmucs were known as the original settlers of the area in western New England.  This territory encompassed the central trail to all areas of the northeast called the "Great Path" or the Blackstone River Valley National Heritage Corridor. The Nipmucs or "western" band of Indians were known as the "fresh water fishing" tribe or "people from the small pond", since they inhabited inland areas of New England.  The Nipmuc people were known as a hunting and gathering tribe who lived a "scattered existence." They migrated during the seasons to follow their food source to hunt, fish, and to cultivate the "three sisters"; corn, beans and squash. They also made canoes out of hollowed out logs, which was their main mode of transportation on the lake.

Colonial arrival
English settlers arrived to the Worcester County area and found, what looked to them as, dispersed yet abandoned villages.  The Nipmuc that were encountered, were friendly and attempted to adopt the white man's ways. Rev. John Eliot introduced and converted many Native Americans to Christianity.  Clusters of the converted Indians formed “praying towns” to practice their new religion. In 1637, the first settlement of Worcester was called the “Village of Quinsigamond” or the “Quinsigamond Plantation.”  Three buildings formed the heart of the Village, Quinsigamond branch library, the Quinsigamond school, and the Quinsigamond fire house.  It functioned as a self-sustaining community which was predomidantly populated with Swedish and Irish immigrants.

Land Rights Law
The English persuaded the Nipmuc people to allow the purchase of large amounts of land for minimal compensation.  In 1652, the “Indian Land Rights Law” was passed. The law stated that Indian tribes would forfeit the title of their land if they hadn't made improvements upon it. When the Nipmuc realized their land was being taken from them, they joined the rise of King Philip's War.

King Philip's War (1675-1676)
A man named Metacomet was a Wampanoag Indian leader who was known as King Philip. 

He was mainly responsible for initiating the war.  Metacomet and his band of Wampanoag Indians fought the colonist after the land called Plymouth was taken from them.  King Philip's War was brutal and devastated most of the settlements in New England.  By the time the war had ended, most of the villages approximately from Marlboro to Grafton were destroyed, having been burnt to the ground.  The remaining Nipmuc Indians in the area, were captured and exiled to Deer Island in Boston Harbor without proper clothing, food, or provisions.  The bulk of the Nipmuc population perished, or were forced to live on reservations in the Worcester County area.  The overall toll of the conflict dwindled the size of the Indian bands considerably to less than 1,000.

Industrialization of Worcester
In 1684,  the English settlers of Quinsigamond Village changed their community name to "Worcester", to honor the King of England's defeat during the Civil War.   The colonists utilized the lake for recreational sports like swimming, boating, fishing. In 1722, Worcester became a town and grew into a city, focusing its efforts on promoting the tourism industry.  In the 20th century the Quinsigamond Lake area grew into an amusement park tourist attraction offering picnic areas, boat rides, concerts, a dance hall, and a rollerskating rink.  Horrace Bigelow purchased much of the land around the lake for summer homes.  He also owned much of the lake real estate and boasted to friends that the park was drenched in "fifty thousand electric lights."  Thus, the east side of the lake area (now in the town of Shrewsbury) became nicknamed  "White City".    Competitive rowing teams were extremely popular on the lake. The Olympic rowing trials were held on Lake Quinsigamond in 1952.

Modern day
Today, Nipmuc people live on the Chaubunagungamaug Reservation area in Webster, and the Hassanamisco Reservation in Grafton. The Indian population is about 2,000 people.  Many continue the old way of life and carry on the traditions of their ancestors.  The Quinsigamond Lake region is no longer home to an amusement park but a shopping area, and there are two state parks on the lake.  The current usage of Quinsigamond Lake remains popular for  recreational use.  Many college and area club rowing teams continue to utilize the lake for this sport.  As the second largest city in Massachusetts, Worcester became known as "the heart of the commonwealth" and has continued to prosper.  Quinsigamond Community College has flourished as one of six biggest colleges in the Worcester Area. It has also continued to proudly bear the iconic original name of "Quinsigamond” and represent the rich cultural Native American history.  Jack O'Connell (author) has written a group of mystery novels set in the fictional city of Quinsigamond.

References

External links
 Worcester Historical Museum
 QCC Public Library
 Worcester official website

Algonquian languages